Erigeron asperugineus, the Idaho fleabane, is a species of flowering plant in the family Asteraceae. It is native to the Western United States, particularly the states of Montana, Idaho, Utah, and Nevada.

Erigeron asperugineus is a small perennial herb up to 20 cm (8 inches) tall, the stems mostly leafless and often lying flat. The basal leaves have short hair with meandering margins and are wider towards the tip.

References

asperugineus
Flora of the Western United States
Plants described in 1871
Flora without expected TNC conservation status